The Women's moguls event in freestyle skiing at the 1994 Winter Olympics in Lillehammer took place from 15–16 February at Kanthaugen Freestyle Arena.

Results

Qualification
The top 16 advanced to the final.

Final

References

External links
Sports-Reference - 1994 Women's Moguls

Women's freestyle skiing at the 1994 Winter Olympics
1994 in women's sport
Free